For information on all Central Connecticut State University sports, see Central Connecticut Blue Devils

The Central Connecticut Blue Devils men's soccer team is a varsity intercollegiate athletic team of Central Connecticut State University in New Britain, Connecticut, United States. The team is a member of the Northeast Conference, which is part of the National Collegiate Athletic Association's Division I. Northwestern's first men's soccer team was fielded in 1969. The team plays its home games at Central Connecticut Soccer Field in New Britain, which opened in 2012 and sits 1,000. The Blue Devils are coached by David Kelly.

Seasons

NCAA tournament results 

Central Connecticut has appeared in one NCAA tournament.

References

External links 
 
 2016-17 CCSU Records

 
1969 establishments in Connecticut